"Show Me Love" is a song by Swedish singer and songwriter Robyn. It was first released in Sweden in 1997 as a single from the international edition of her debut studio album, Robyn Is Here (1995). The song is her fourth Swedish, third UK, and second US single. The song is sometimes confused with Robin S.'s 1993 single "Show Me Love" because of identical song titles and similar first names; however, the two songs are not related.

History
In her home country of Sweden, "Show Me Love" became Robyn's fourth hit, peaking at number 14, lower than "Do You Know (What It Takes)" and "Do You Really Want Me (Show Respect)", which both went top 10. In the United States, the single peaked at number seven, her second consecutive top 10 hit. In December 1997, the single received a gold certification from the RIAA in recognition of 500,000 copies sold in the US. It was Robyn's last top-10 hit and remains her last charting single on the Hot 100. In the United Kingdom, "Show Me Love" became Robyn's first of two top-20 hits from Robyn Is Here and her first top-10 hit, peaking at number eight; it was Robyn's fourth biggest hit, with 113,000 sales and 1.22 million audio streams according to the Official Charts Company.

In 2008, a re-recorded version of the song appeared on the special edition of Robyn's eponymous album.

Critical reception
Larry Flick from Billboard described the song as a "far more seductive tone of this jeep-pop confection" than her earlier hit single, "Do You Know (What It Takes)". He noted that Robyn "proves her capability to handle a meaty tune with a respectable degree of soul. She tweaks the song's ear-grabbing chorus and muscular bassline with subtle improvisations and an assertive edge that impresses." Can't Stop the Pop stated that on the song "she's dropping her guard and committing herself to a teen-pop romance". They added that the chorus is "spectacularly catchy".

Music video
The accompanying music video for "Show Me Love" was directed by Kevin Bray and premiered on 20 July 1997 on the television network The Box. The video is shot with two cutscenes: one with Robyn alone lip-syncing to camera filmed in mostly color and the other of her in a black sweatsuit lip-syncing to camera filmed in mostly black-and-white with a large group of urbane mostly Gen X extras shown conversing in a loosely grouped line behind her while a guitarist, keytar player, and drummer with drumkit play among them. In tribute to Gianni who had died the same week Robyn was doing promotion in Miami that summer her stylist had her dress in a light blue Versace top in its cutscenes which she didn't realize until decades later.

Usage in media
The song was performed in 1997 on the television series All That and features on the soundtrack of TV series Sabrina, the Teenage Witch. It was also played at the very end of the Swedish film Show Me Love. The film was originally titled Fucking Åmål but was retitled for distribution in the English-speaking world after the name of the song.

In 2019 the song was featured in the West End musical & Juliet.

Impact and legacy
Pitchfork ranked "Show Me Love" number 241 in their list of The 250 Best Songs of the 1990s in 2022.

Track listings

European single
CD single
"Show Me Love"  – 3:27
"Show Me Love"  – 5:08
"Show Me Love"  – 4:28
"Do You Know (What It Takes)"  – 4:59

CD maxi-single
"Show Me Love"  – 3:27
"Show Me Love"  – 4:28
"Show Me Love"  – 5:08
"Show Me Love"  – 8:08
"Show Me Love"  – 7:18

Swedish single
CD promo
"Show Me Love"  – 3:27

US single
CD single
"Show Me Love"  – 3:50
"Show Me Love"  – 4:28

CD maxi-single
"Show Me Love"  – 4:53
"Show Me Love"  – 8:08
"Show Me Love"  – 4:28
"Show Me Love"  – 5:08

12-inch single
Side A
"Show Me Love"  – 8:08
"Show Me Love"  – 4:53
Side B
"Show Me Love"  – 4:28
"Show Me Love"  – 7:18

12-inch limited edition
Side A
"Show Me Love"  – 8:22
"Show Me Love"  – 4:58
Side B
"Show Me Love"  – 6:41
"Show Me Love"  – 4:53

Charts

Weekly charts

Year-end charts

Certifications

Release history

References

External links
 

1997 singles
1997 songs
Ariola Records singles
Bertelsmann Music Group singles
RCA Records singles
Robyn songs
Songs written by Max Martin
Song recordings produced by Max Martin
Song recordings produced by Denniz Pop
Songs written by Robyn